Eglantin Dhima (born 22 August 1990 in Shkodër) is an Albanian football player who most recently played as a midfielder for Turbina.

References

1990 births
Living people
Footballers from Vlorë
Albanian footballers
Association football midfielders
Ethnikos Asteras F.C. players
KF Himara players
KS Sopoti Librazhd players
FK Kukësi players
KS Turbina Cërrik players
Albanian expatriate footballers
Expatriate footballers in Greece
Albanian expatriate sportspeople in Greece